Montgomery Waterway Restoration Trust is a British registered charity, number 510448, which exists to promote the restoration of the Montgomery Canal.

History
The first efforts to restore the Montgomery Canal were made by the Shropshire Union Canal Society in 1968, when the section in Welshpool was restored. Further progress towards restoration was made in 1980, when the concept of a restored canal was written into the Shropshire and Powys County Structure Plan. Seven years later, British Waterways obtained an Act of Parliament to authorise the restoration. This was the first occurrence of such an Act being granted. With the need to co-ordinate a number of authorities and manage applications for grants to fund the work, an umbrella organisation was needed, and so the Montgomery Waterway Restoration Trust was created.

The Trust was formed in 1980 and its members include:
Inland Waterways Association
Montgomeryshire Wildlife Trust
Powys County Council
The Prince's Trust
Shropshire Council
Shropshire Union Canal Society
Shropshire Wildlife Trust
Waterway Recovery Group

"Friends of the Montgomery Canal" is a less formal group, created by the Trust for people living in the canal corridor, which provides them with information and opportunities for involvement in various canal-related activities. The Friends organises events including the annual Montgomery Dinghy Dawdle, which provides an opportunity for a large number of people in unpowered boats such as canoes and coracles to explore a section of the canal, and generates publicity for future restoration. The event is jointly organised with the Shropshire Union Canal Society.

Activity
One of the first big tests for the new organisation occurred in 1982, after the Powys Structure Plan had included a clause protecting the canal north of Whitehorse Bridge No. 120. Just three weeks later, the British Waterways Board announced that they would not be starting any more work on the canal once the existing work at Frankton and Carreghofa was completed. They declared that restoration of the whole canal was uncertain, and that no water for it would be available from the Llangollen Canal. The Trust then requested a meeting with Sir Frank Price, the chairman of the BWB, and the two organisations agreed on the need for an economic study, which would inform future development plans. The meeting was held on 5 April, and the report was to be completed by October of that year.

See also

Canals of the United Kingdom
History of the British canal system
Shropshire Union Canal Society

Bibliography

References

External links
 Pete’s Montgomery Canal web-site, incorporating the Montgomery Waterway Restoration Trust

Waterways organisations in England
Charities based in Shropshire